Events in the year 1901 in Iceland.

Incumbents 

 Monarch: Christian IX
 Minister for Iceland: August Hermann Ferdinand Carl Goos (until 24 July); Peter Adler Alberti onwards

Events 

 24 July – Peter Adler Alberti is appointed Minister for Iceland.
 Powers of Darkness is published.

References 

 
1900s in Iceland
Years of the 20th century in Iceland
Iceland
Iceland